Analídia Torre (born 10 October 1976 in Portela Susa) is a retired Portuguese long-distance runner who specialized in cross-country running.

International competitions

Personal bests
1500 metres - 4:15.61 min (2000)
3000 metres - 9:06.95 min (2001)
3000 metres steeplechase - 10:03.16 min (2002)
5000 metres - 15:35.51 min (2000)
10,000 metres - 33:50.17 min (2000)
Half marathon - 1:17:48 hrs (2003)

References
 

1976 births
Living people
Portuguese female long-distance runners
Portuguese female steeplechase runners
People from Viana do Castelo
Sportspeople from Viana do Castelo District